Events in the year 2022 in Afghanistan.

According to the United Nations Development Programme, by 2022, 97% of Afghans could fall under the poverty threshold, which would plunge the country into a major humanitarian crisis.

After the Fall of Kabul, in which the Islamist Taliban drove out the Islamic Republic of Afghanistan government after its 20-year rule, the Taliban promised to set up a new constitution for Afghanistan. The constitution is intended to be adopted in 2022.

The Islamic State continue their insurgency, carrying out many bombings. Afghanistan is also badly affected by earthquakes and flooding.

Incumbents

Events

Ongoing 
 Afghanistan conflict (1978–present)
 Islamic State–Taliban conflict
 Republican insurgency in Afghanistan
 COVID-19 pandemic in Afghanistan

January 
 1 January – India sends 500,000 doses of Covaxin to Afghanistan as a part of a humanitarian aid program.
 9 January – Faizullah Jalal, a professor at Kabul University and a critic of the Taliban, is arrested by the new Government of Afghanistan.
 16 January – Last of the 2021–2022 Afghan protests
 17 January – A 5.3 magnitude earthquake strikes Badghis Province, killing at least 26 people.
 22 January – Herat bus bombing

February 
 2 February - Taliban reopens public universities across the country.
 5 February – Afghanistan–Pakistan border skirmishes – Tehrik-i-Taliban militants based in Afghanistan cross into Kurram District and attack a Pakistani Army checkpoint on the Durand Line, killing five Pakistani soldiers.
 15 February – Death of Haider
 24 February – Eight workers for a United Nations polio vaccination program are murdered in four different locations in northern Afghanistan.

March 
 4 March – Islamic State – Khorasan Province detonate a bomb in a mosque in Paktia Province, killing three people and injuring at least 24.

April 
 9 April – 2022 Afghanistan-Pakistan clashes
 16 April – 2022 Pakistani airstrikes in Afghanistan
 19 April – April 2022 Kabul school bombing
 21 April – 2022 Mazar-i-Sharif mosque bombing
 22 April – 2022 Kunduz mosque bombing
 28 April – 28 April 2022 Mazar-i-Sharif bombings
 29 April – April 2022 Kabul mosque bombing

May 
 1 May – Afghanistan's supreme leader Hibatullah Akhundzada made a public appearance on the occasion of Eid al-Fitr.
 5 May – A series of floods kill 22 people.
 25 May:
 May 2022 Kabul mosque bombing 
 2022 Mazar-i-Sharif minivan bombings

June 

 22 June – A magnitude 6.0 earthquake strikes Khost Province, killing at least 1,163 people and injuring over 3,000. Over 25 villages were razed to the ground. The Barmal District was worst affected, with nearly half of the fatalities occurring there. 238 others were also killed in the Gayan District, where over 70% of the district's houses collapsed. The Spera District, closest to the earthquake's epicentre, experienced 40 fatalities, and the destruction of 500 homes. It is deadliest earthquake in Afghanistan since 1998.
 29 June – Afghanistan Ulema gathering

July 
 31 July - Killing of Ayman al-Zawahiri

August 
 5 August - 5 August 2022 Kabul bombing
 17 August - August 2022 Kabul mosque bombing

September 
 2 September - 2022 Herat mosque bombing
 5 September
Bombing of the Russian embassy in Kabul
September 2022 Afghanistan earthquake
 23 September - September 2022 Kabul mosque bombing
 30 September - September 2022 Kabul school bombing

November 
 10 November - Ministry of Virtue and Vice issues ban on women from entering parks and gyms throughout the country.
 30 November - 2022 Aybak bombing

December 
 6 December - December 2022 Mazar-i-Sharif bombing
 12 December - 2022 Kabul hotel attack
 18 December - At least 20 people are killed when a tank truck overturns, explodes and catches fire in the Salang Tunnel.
 20 December - Taliban bans Afghan women from attending universities cause of islamic shariyyah. Which gives them lots of opportunities.

See also 
 Terrorist incidents in Afghanistan in 2022

References 

 
Afghanistan
Afghanistan
2020s in Afghanistan
Years of the 21st century in Afghanistan